Imbert is a town in the Puerto Plata province of the Dominican Republic. The town is named after José María Imbert.

Climate

References

Sources 
 – World-Gazetteer.com

Populated places in Puerto Plata Province
Municipalities of the Dominican Republic